Leandro Hernán Godoy (born 9 December 1994) is an Argentine professional footballer who plays as a defender. He is currently a free agent.

Career
Godoy's career started with Argentine Primera División club Arsenal de Sarandí, he made his debut for Arsenal in a 2013–14 Argentine Primera División fixture on 11 May 2014 as the club drew 0–0 with Belgrano. Six more appearances followed in the 2014 and 2015 seasons, including one in a 1–6 away win against Atlético de Rafaela during which Godoy scored his first career goal. On 4 January 2016, Godoy completed a loan move to Primera B Metropolitana side Barracas Central. He appeared in six fixtures before returning to Arsenal. In January 2018, Godoy terminated his contract with Arsenal.

Career statistics
.

References

External links

1994 births
Living people
Sportspeople from Buenos Aires Province
Argentine footballers
Association football defenders
Argentine Primera División players
Primera B Metropolitana players
Arsenal de Sarandí footballers
Barracas Central players